Greatest Hits is a greatest hits album by English-American rock band The Pretenders, released in 2000. It was only their second greatest hits album in 22 years, but less successful than its predecessor, The Singles, released in 1987. It contains six songs not featured on the previous compilation: "Human", "Forever Young", "Night in My Veins", "Spiritual High (State of Independence)", "Popstar" and "I'll Stand by You".

The track "Human" is a cover of the 1995 song "Human on the Inside" by Australian rock duo, Divinyls.

Track listing

Charts

Certifications

References

The Pretenders compilation albums
2000 greatest hits albums